The Utrecht Atlas of the solar spectrum is a detailed inventory in graphical form of spectral lines observed in sunlight at the Sonnenborgh Observatory. The visible spectrum is about 390 to 700 nm and the atlas covers from 361.2 to 877.1 nm (plus an appendix) so that the atlas has some coverage of the infrared and ultraviolet spectrum of sunlight. The atlas, compiled by Minnaert and his students Mulders and Houtgast, was published in 1940 shortly before the WWII invasion of the Netherlands.

History
In the early nineteenth century, Joseph von Fraunhofer made the first systematic inventory of spectral lines in sunlight. Full understanding of the significance of Fraunhofer lines required a huge amount of pioneering research in astrophysics and quantum theory. Cecilia Payne (1925) demonstrated that variations in stellar line strengths can be explained by the Saha ionization equation. Payne's work lead to a major study of the chemical abundances in the solar atmosphere undertaken by H. N. Russell, Walter S. Adams, and Charlotte Moore. Around 1930, the procedures developed by Russell, Adams, and Moore were adapted by Minnaert and Mulders for determining chemical abundances in stellar photospheres. Houtgast invented a modification of Moll's microphotometer that Minnaert, Mulders, and Houtgast employed to make direct registrations of the solar line intensities.

According to Minnaert at a seminar on the occasion of his 70th birthday:

References

External links
 (Example of Utrecht Atlas data, p. 271)

1940 non-fiction books
1940 in science
Astronomy books